Grants is a city in Cibola County, New Mexico, United States. The population was 9,163 at the 2020 Census. It is the county seat of Cibola County.

Grants is located along the Trails of the Ancients Byway, one of the designated New Mexico Scenic Byways.

History
Grants began as a railroad camp in the 1880s, when three Canadian brothers – Angus A. Grant, John R. Grant, and Lewis A. Grant – were awarded a contract to build a section of the Atlantic and Pacific Railroad through the region. The Grant brothers' camp was first called Grants Camp, then Grants Station, and finally Grants. The new city enveloped the existing colonial New Mexican settlement of Los Alamitos and grew along the tracks of the Atlantic and Pacific Railroad.

The town prospered as a result of railroad logging in the nearby Zuni Mountains, and it served as a section point for the Atlantic and Pacific, which became part of the Atchison, Topeka and Santa Fe Railway. The Zuni Mountain Railroad short line had a roundhouse in town (near present-day Exit 81 off Interstate 40) and housed workers in a small community named Breecetown. Timber from the Zuni Mountains was shipped to Albuquerque, where a large sawmill converted the timber to wood products that were sold around the west.

After the decline of logging in the 1930s, Grants-Milan gained fame as the "carrot capital" of the United States. Agriculture was aided by the creation of Bluewater Reservoir, and the region's volcanic soils provided ideal conditions for farming. Grants also benefited from its location, both being an airway beacon and later by U.S. Route 66, which brought travelers and tourists and the businesses that catered to them. Today the beacon and FSS building on the airport (KGNT) is being restored as the Western New Mexico Aviation Heritage Museum.

Perhaps the most memorable boom in the town's history occurred when Paddy Martinez, a Navajo shepherd, discovered uranium ore near Haystack Mesa, sparking a mining boom that lasted until the 1980s (see Uranium mining in New Mexico). The collapse of mining pulled the town into a depression, but the town has enjoyed a resurgence based on interest in tourism and the scenic beauty of the region. Recent interest in nuclear power has revived the possibility of more uranium mining in the area, and energy companies still own viable mining properties and claims in the area.

Geography
Grants is located in north-central Cibola County. Santa Fe Avenue (former Route 66) is the main road through the city, while Interstate 40 passes through the south side of the city, with access from exits 81 and 85. The town of Milan borders the northwest end of Grants.

Grants is on the north end of the large and recent (youngest flows around 3,000 years old) lava field known as El Malpais ("the badlands"), part of which is preserved as El Malpais National Monument. To the northeast of town are the San Mateo Mountains and Mount Taylor, at  the highest peak in the region. West of the city is the Continental Divide and the Zuni Mountains, an eroded anticline with 2-billion-year-old Precambrian granites and metamorphic rocks at its core. The region is primarily high desert country, dominated by sandstones and lava flows.

Climate
Grants has a typical New Mexico cool semi-arid climate (Köppen BSk). The three wettest months are July, August and September, during the monsoon season. Even during the monsoon season, diurnal temperature ranges are very large, being at or above  almost year-round.

From October, when the monsoon retreats, afternoon temperatures fall from very warm to hot down to comfortable by November and to cool during the winter proper.

During the spring, the weather steadily heats up, with maxima topping  before the end of April and reaching  on 35.6 afternoons – although only five mornings on record have stayed above . During this early summer period, the weather remains very dry, so that mornings remain cool even into June – as late as June 23, 1964 the temperature fell to freezing. The hottest temperature on record has been  on July 14, 2003, and June 28, 2013.

Demographics

As of the census of 2000, there were 8,806 people, 3,202 households, and 2,321 families residing in the city. The population density was 644.4 people per square mile (248.7/km2). There were 3,626 housing units at an average density of 265.3 per square mile (102.4/km2). The racial makeup of the city among Non-Hispanic groups was 56.18% White, 1.62% African American, 11.97% Native American, 0.92% Asian, 0.12% Pacific Islander, 24.80% from other races, and 4.38% from two or more races. Hispanic or Latino of any race were 52.36% of the population.

There were 3,202 households, out of which 37.5% had children under the age of 18 living with them, 49.5% were married couples living together, 17.1% had a female householder with no husband present, and 27.5% were non-families. 24.1% of all households were made up of individuals, and 8.5% had someone living alone who was 65 years of age or older. The average household size was 2.61 and the average family size was 3.06.

In the city, the population was spread out, with 28.8% under the age of 18, 9.3% from 18 to 24, 27.9% from 25 to 44, 21.7% from 45 to 64, and 12.3% who were 65 years of age or older. The median age was 34 years. For every 100 females, there were 85.3 males. For every 100 females age 18 and over, there were 79.4 males.

The median income for a household in the city was $30,652, and the median income for a family was $33,464. Males had a median income of $31,870 versus $20,808 for females. The per capita income for the city was $14,053. About 19.4% of families and 21.9% of the population were below the poverty line, including 31.8% of those under age 18 and 11.1% of those age 65 or over.

Education 
All public schools in the county are operated by Grants/Cibola County Schools. Seven elementary schools, one middle school and two high schools serve Grants and Cibola County. Los Alamitos Middle School and Grants High School serve Grants.

St. Teresa of Avila Catholic School, of the Roman Catholic Diocese of Gallup, is the only private accredited school in the city and serves grades pre-Kindergarten through eighth grades. The school building opened in 1945.

There is a branch of New Mexico State University offering a two-year postsecondary program as well as advanced degrees through distance education.

Culture
The National Park Service and the Bureau of Land Management operate the El Malpais Visitor Center at Exit 85 off Interstate 40 in Grants. The visitor center highlights the many features of El Malpais National Monument and El Malpais National Conservation Area.

There is a mining museum in town, as well as the Western New Mexico Aviation Heritage Museum at the Grants-Milan Municipal Airport.

On Route 66/Santa Fe Avenue, the Cibola Arts Council runs an art gallery and museum that features the works of local artists and many Route 66 artifacts including a Ford Model T roadster. The museum hosts special events, shows, and openings on a regular basis.

There is a Tibetan Buddhist stupa in the Zuni Mountains west of town, the Zuni Mountain Stupa.

Communications

Radio 
 KDSK-FM (92.7 MHz)
 KSFE (FM) (96.7 MHz)
 KMIN (980 kHz)

Television
 KOB-TV (4) (NBC affiliate)
 KOAT (7) (ABC affiliate)
 7 Cities (10)
 KRQE (13) (CBS affiliate)

Print 
 Cibola Citizen (formerly Cibola Beacon)
 Gallup Independent

Online media 
 TheRacingExperts.com

Notable people 

 Greg Baldwin (born 1960), actor and voice actor
 Joseph Fidel (1923–2015), member of the New Mexico Senate
George Hanosh (1938–2008), member of the New Mexico House of Representatives
 Al Johnson (1922–2011), NFL player for the Philadelphia Eagles and coach for Western New Mexico University
 Walter K. Martinez (1930–1986), member and speaker of the New Mexico House of Representatives
 W. Ken Martinez (born 1959), member and speaker of the New Mexico House of Representatives
 Paddy Martinez (1881–1969), prospector who discovered uranium at Haystack Mesa
 Dianna Ortiz (born 1961), Roman Catholic sister of the Ursuline order who was abducted by the Guatemalan military
 Clemente Sanchez (born 1958), member of the New Mexico Senate
 Marvin Stephens (1922–2008), actor known for the Mickey McGuire and Jones Family film series
 David Ulibarri, former member of the New Mexico Senate and Cibola County manager
 Jack Wallace (1925–1995), NFL player and coach

Popular culture
 Author Robison Wells has stated in his novel On Second Thought that the fictional town of Alamitos is based on Grants, which is the historical name before it was renamed after the mining camp. Wells lived in Grants during the late-1990s.
Grants is mentioned as a central location in the Louis L'Amour novel Flint.

References

External links

 City of Grants official website
 

 
Cities in Cibola County, New Mexico
Cities in New Mexico
County seats in New Mexico
Micropolitan areas of New Mexico
Mining communities in New Mexico